The history of Belgrade dates back to at least 7000 BC. One of the largest prehistoric cultures of Europe, the Vinča culture, evolved from the Belgrade area in the 6th millennium BC. In antiquity, Thraco-Dacians inhabited the region, and after 279 BC Celts conquered the city, naming it Singidūn. It was conquered by the Romans during the reign of Augustus, and awarded city rights in the mid 2nd century. It was settled by the Slavs in the 520s, and changed hands several times before it became the capital of King Stefan Dragutin (1282–1316). In 1521 Belgrade was conquered by the Ottoman Empire and became the seat of a sanjak. It frequently passed from Ottoman to Habsburg rule, which saw the destruction of most of the city during the Austro-Ottoman wars. Belgrade was again named the capital of Serbia in 1841. The north of Belgrade remained an Habsburg outpost until 1918, when it was merged into the capital city. As a strategic location, the city was battled over in 115 wars and razed to the ground 44 times. Belgrade was the capital of Yugoslavia (in various forms of governments) from its creation in 1918, to its final dissolution in 2006.

Etymology 
A theory suggests that the ancient name Singidunum (Celtic:) actually bears its modern meaning — "White Fort (town)".

The first mention of Belgrade, in its current form, is from a letter written on 16 April 878, by Pope John VIII to Boris I Mihail, when the city was held by the Bulgarian Kingdom.

The contemporary name of Belgrade derives from the Slavic words "bel" (i.e. "white") and "grad" (i.e. "town"-"city" or "castle"-"fort"). Historically, Slavs name a place of living "grad" or "gorod" only if it has some protective walls – "ograda" in Slavic. And Slavs don't divide between "town" and "city". So the meaning of Belgrade is White City or White Castle.

Serbs write the word Beograd without "l" because they don't pronounce "l" in the word "bel". They write "beo" exactly like they pronounce it.

White City is not so uncommon as a name between Slavic people, for example: Belgorod in Russia, Bilhorod on Dniester in Ukraine, or Biograd na Moru in Croatia.

Prehistory 

 
Chipped stone tools found at Zemun show that the area around Belgrade was inhabited by nomadic foragers in the Palaeolithic and Mesolithic eras. Some of these tools belong to the Mousterian industry, which are associated with Neanderthals rather than modern humans. Aurignacian and Gravettian tools have also been discovered there, indicating occupation between 50,000 and 20,000 years ago.

The first farming people to settle in the region are associated with the Neolithic Starčevo culture, which flourished between 6200 and 5200 BC. There are several Starčevo sites in and around Belgrade, including the eponymous site of Starčevo. The Starčevo culture was succeeded by the Vinča culture (5500–4500 BC), a more sophisticated farming culture that grew out of the earlier Starčevo settlements which is also named for a site in the Belgrade region (Vinča-Belo Brdo). The Vinča culture is known for its very large settlements, one of the earliest settlements by continuous habitation and some of the largest in prehistoric Europe; anthropomorphic figurines such as the Lady of Vinča; the earliest known copper metallurgy in Europe; a proto-writing form developed prior to the Sumerians and Minoans, known as the Old European script, dating back to around 5300 BC.

Antiquity

Pre-Roman (800 BC–75 BC) 
The Paleo-Balkan tribes of Thracians and Dacians were the masters of this area prior to the Roman conquest. Belgrade was inhabited by a Thraco-Dacian tribe Singi, while after the Celtic invasion in 279 BC, the Scordisci took the city, naming it "Singidūn" (dun, fortress).

Roman era (75 BC–395 AD) 

In 34–33 BC, the Roman army led by Silanus reached Belgrade. It became the romanized Singidunum in the 1st century AD, and by the mid-2nd century, the city was proclaimed a municipium by the Roman authorities, evolving into a full-fledged colonia (highest city class) by the end of the century.

The Romans first began to conquer lands surrounding Singidun during the 1st century BC. In 75 BC, Gaius "Quintus" Scribonius Curio, the proconsul of Macedonia, invaded the Balkan interior as far as the Danube, in an effort to drive out the Scordisci, Dardanians, Dacians and other tribes. The Romans had victories during these campaigns, but only stayed briefly, leaving the area outside of Roman control. Thus, very little is known about these operations or when the area was organized into the province of Moesia. It wasn't until the rule of Octavian, when Marcus Licinius Crassus, the grandson of the Caesarian Triumvir and then proconsul of Macedonia, finally stabilized the region with a campaign beginning in 29 BC Moesia was formally organized into a province some time before 6 AD, when the first mention of its governor, Caecina Severus, is made. Singidun was Romanized to Singidunum. It became one of the primary settlements of Moesia, situated between Sirmium (modern Sremska Mitrovica) and Viminacium (modern Kostolac), both of which overshadowed Singidunum in significance, and just across the Sava River from Taurunum (modern Zemun) in Pannonia. Singidunum became an important and strategic position along the Via Militaris, an important Roman road connecting fortresses and settlements along the Danubian limes, or border.

Singidunum reached its height with the arrival of Legio IV Flavia Felix in 86 AD. The legion set up as a square-shaped castrum (fort), which occupied Upper Town of today's Kalemegdan. At first, the fortress was set up as earthen bulwarks, but soon after, it was fortified with stone, the remains of which can be seen today near the northeastern corner of the acropolis. The legion also constructed a bridge over the Sava, connecting Singidunum with Taurunum. The 6,000-strong legion became a major military asset against the continuous threat of the Dacians just across the Danube. Another step the Romans took to help strengthen Singidunum was the settlement of its legion veterans next to the fortress. In time, a large settlement grew out from around the castrum. The town took on a rectilinear construction, with its streets meeting at right angles. The grid structure can be seen in today's Belgrade with the orientation of the streets Uzun Mirkova, Dušanova, and Kralja Petra I. Studentski Trg (Students' Square) was a Roman forum, bordered by thermae (a public bath complex whose remains were discovered during the 1970s) and also preserves the orientation the Romans gave Singidunum. Other remnants of Roman material culture such as tombs, monuments, sculptures, ceramics, and coins have been found villages and towns surrounding Belgrade. Hadrian granted Singidunum the rights of municipium during the mid 2nd century. Singidunum later outgrew this status and became a full-fledged colony. The Roman Emperor Jovian who reestablished Christianity as the official religion of the Roman Empire was born in Singidunum in 332. Singidunum and Moesia experienced a peaceful period, but that was not to last, due to the growing turmoil not only from outside the Roman Empire, but also from within.

The Roman Empire began to decline at the end 3rd century. The province of Dacia, established by several successful and lengthy campaigns by Trajan, began to collapse under pressure from the invading Goths in 256. By 270, Aurelian, faced with the sudden loss of many provinces and major damage done by invading tribes, abandoned Dacia altogether. Singidunum found itself once again on the limes of the fading Empire, one of the last major strongholds to survive mounting danger from the invading barbarian tribes.

Middle Ages

Byzantine (395–626) 

 
In 395, upon the death of Theodosius I, the Roman Empire was split into two, with Singidunum lying on the northwestern border of the Eastern Roman Empire (later to become the Byzantine Empire). Moesia and Illyricum suffered devastating raids by the successive invasions of the Huns, Ostrogoths, Gepids, Sarmatians, Avars, and Slavs. Singidunum fell to the Huns in 441, who razed the city and fortress, selling its Roman inhabitants into indentured servitude. Over the next two hundred years, the city passed hands several times: the Romans reclaimed the city after the fall of the Hun confederation in 454, but the Sarmatians conquered the city shortly thereafter. In 470 the Ostrogoths seized the city around, expelling the Sarmatians. The city was later invaded by Gepids (488), but the Ostrogoths recaptured it in 504. Six years later the Eastern Roman Empire reclaimed the city according to a peace treaty.

Byzantine emperor Justinian I rebuilt Singidunum in 535, restoring the fortress and city to its former military importance. The city saw a brief peaceful period of about fifty years, but was then sacked with the arrival of the Avars in 584. During Maurice's Balkan campaigns, Singidunum served as a base of operations, but it was lost again in the early half of the 7th century when the Avars sacked and burned Singidunum to the ground. Around 630, the Slavs settled in the area and in Singidunum, coordinated by a Roman fortress commander. By this time, however, the city had lost its importance as a border fortification and was largely ignored by the Slavs, who dominated the area.

Early Middle Ages 
In 442, the area was ravaged by Attila the Hun. In 471, it was taken by Theodoric the Great, who continued into Greece. As the Ostrogoths left for Italy, the Gepids took over the city. In 539 it was retaken by the Byzantines. In 577, some 100,000 Slavs poured into Thrace and Illyricum, pillaging cities and settling down. The Avars under Bayan I conquered the whole region by 582. According to Byzantine chronicle De Administrando Imperio, the White Serbs had stopped in Belgrade on their way back home, asking the strategos for lands; they received provinces in the west, towards the Adriatic, which they would rule as subjects to Heraclius (610–641). The first record of the name Belograd appeared on April, 16th, 878, in a letter from Pope John VIII to the ruler of the Bulgarian Empire Boris I, part of which was the city. For about four centuries, the city remained a battleground between the Byzantine Empire, the Kingdom of Hungary and the Bulgarian Empire.

High Middle Ages 
Basil II (976–1025) installed a garrison in Belgrade. The city hosted the armies of the First and the Second Crusade; while passing through during the Third Crusade, Frederick Barbarossa and his 190,000 crusaders saw Belgrade in ruins.

Stephen Dragutin (r. 1276–1282), received Belgrade from his father-in-law, Stephen V of Hungary in 1284; it served as the capital of the Kingdom of Syrmia, and Dragutin is regarded as the first Serbian king to rule over Belgrade.

Late Middle Ages 
Following the Battle of Maritsa in 1371 and the Battle of Kosovo in 1389, the Serbian Empire began to crumble as the Ottoman Empire conquered its southern territory. The north resisted through the Serbian Despotate, which had Belgrade as its capital. The city flourished under Stefan Lazarević, son of Serbian prince Lazar Hrebeljanović. Lazarević built a castle with a citadel and towers, of which only the Despot's tower and west wall remain. He also refortified the city's ancient walls, allowing the Despotate to resist the Ottomans for almost 70 years. During this time, Belgrade was a haven for many Balkan peoples fleeing Ottoman rule, and is thought to have had a population of 40,000 to 50,000 people.

In 1427, Stefan's successor Đurađ Branković had to return Belgrade to the Hungarian king, and Smederevo became the new capital. Although the Ottomans captured most of the Serbian Despotate, Nándorfehérvár – as it was known in the Kingdom of Hungary – was unsuccessfully besieged in 1440 and again in 1456. As it presented an obstacle to their advance into Hungary and further Europe, over 100,000 Ottoman soldiers launched the 1456 Siege of Nándorfehérvár, in which the Christian army under commander John Hunyadi successfully defended the city from the Ottomans, wounding Sultan Mehmed II. The noon bell ordered by Pope Callixtus III commemorates the victory throughout the Christian world to this day.

Early modern period

Ottoman conquest and Austrian invasions 

Seven decades after the initial siege, on 28 August 1521, the fort was finally captured by Ottoman Sultan Suleyman the Magnificent and his 250,000 soldiers; subsequently, most of the city was razed to the ground and its entire Orthodox Christian population was deported to Istanbul, to an area that has since become known as the Belgrade forest. Belgrade was made the seat of the district (Sanjak), becoming the second largest Ottoman town in Europe at over 100,000 people, surpassed only by Constantinople. Ottoman rule also introduced Ottoman architecture, including numerous mosques, increasing the city's Oriental influences. In 1594, a major Serb rebellion was crushed by the Ottomans. Later, Grand vizier Sinan Pasha ordered the relics of Saint Sava to be publicly torched on the Vračar plateau; in the 20th century, the Temple of Saint Sava was built to commemorate this event.
Occupied by the Habsburgs three times (1688–1690, 1717–1739, 1789–1791), headed by the Holy Roman Princes Maximilian of Bavaria and Eugene of Savoy, and field marshal Baron Ernst Gideon von Laudon respectively, Belgrade was quickly recaptured by the Ottomans and substantially razed each time. During this period, the city was affected by the two Great Serbian Migrations, in which hundreds of thousands of Serbs, led by two Serbian Patriarchs, retreated together with the Austrians into the Habsburg Empire, settling in today's Vojvodina and Slavonia.

Modern period

Capital of independent Serbia 
During the First Serbian Uprising, the Serbian revolutionaries held the city from 8 January 1807 until 1813, when it was retaken by the Ottomans. After the Second Serbian Uprising in 1815, Serbia reached semi-independence, which was formally recognized by the Porte in 1830. In 1841, Prince Mihailo Obrenović moved the capital from Kragujevac to Belgrade.

In May 1868, Prince Mihailo was assassinated with his cousin Anka Konstantinović while riding in a carriage through the park of his country residence.

With the Principality's full independence in 1878, and its transformation into the Kingdom of Serbia in 1882, Belgrade once again became a key city in the Balkans, and developed rapidly. Nevertheless, conditions in Serbia as a whole remained those of an overwhelmingly agrarian country, even with the opening of a railway to Niš, Serbia's second city, and in 1900 the capital had only 70,000 inhabitants (at the time Serbia numbered 1.5 million). Yet by 1905 the population had grown to more than 80,000, and by the outbreak of World War I in 1914, it had surpassed 100,000 citizens, not counting Zemun which then belonged to Austria-Hungary.

The first-ever projection of motion pictures in the Balkans and Central Europe was held in Belgrade, in June 1896 by Andre Carr, a representative of the Lumière brothers. He shot the first motion pictures of Belgrade in the next year; however, they have not been preserved.

World War I and the Interbellum 

The First World War began on 28 July 1914 when Austria-Hungary declared war on Serbia. Most of the subsequent Balkan offensives occurred near Belgrade. Austro-Hungarian monitors shelled Belgrade on 29 July 1914, and it was taken by the Austro-Hungarian Army under General Oskar Potiorek on 30 November. On 15 December, it was re-taken by Serbian troops under Marshal Radomir Putnik. After a prolonged battle which destroyed much of the city, between 6 and 9 October 1915, Belgrade fell to German and Austro-Hungarian troops commanded by Field Marshal August von Mackensen on 9 October 1915. The city was liberated by Serbian and French troops on 1 November 1918, under the command of Marshal Louis Franchet d'Espérey of France and Crown Prince Alexander of Serbia. Since Belgrade was decimated as the front-line city, Subotica overtook the title of the largest city in the Kingdom for a short while.

After the war, Belgrade became the capital of the new Kingdom of Serbs, Croats and Slovenes, renamed the Kingdom of Yugoslavia in 1929. The Kingdom was split into banovinas, and Belgrade, together with Zemun and Pančevo, formed a separate administrative unit.

During this period, the city experienced fast growth and significant modernisation. Belgrade's population grew to 239,000 by 1931 (incorporating the town of Zemun, formerly in Austria-Hungary), and 320,000 by 1940. The population growth rate between 1921 and 1948 averaged 4.08% a year. In 1927, Belgrade's first airport opened, and in 1929, its first radio station began broadcasting. The Pančevo Bridge, which crosses the Danube, was opened in 1935, while King Alexander Bridge over the Sava was opened in 1934. On 3 September 1939 the first Belgrade Grand Prix, the last Grand Prix motor racing race before the outbreak of World War II, was held around the Belgrade Fortress and was followed by 80,000 spectators. The winner was Tazio Nuvolari.

World War II 
On 25 March 1941, the government of regent Crown Prince Paul signed the Tripartite Pact, joining the Axis powers in an effort to stay out of the Second World War and keep Yugoslavia neutral during the conflict. This was immediately followed by mass protests in Belgrade and a military coup d'état led by Air Force commander General Dušan Simović, who proclaimed King Peter II to be of age to rule the realm. Consequently, the city was heavily bombed by the Luftwaffe on 6 April 1941, when up to 24,000 people were killed. Yugoslavia was then invaded by German, Italian, Hungarian, and Bulgarian forces, Belgrade was occupied by the German Army on 13 April 1941 and suburbs as far east as Zemun, in the Belgrade metropolitan area, were incorporated into a Nazi state, the Independent State of Croatia. Belgrade became the seat of the Nedić regime, headed by General Milan Nedić.

During the summer and fall of 1941, in reprisal for guerrilla attacks, the Germans carried out several massacres of Belgrade citizens; in particular, members of the Jewish community were subject to mass shootings at the order of General Franz Böhme, the German Military Governor of Serbia. Böhme rigorously enforced the rule that for every German killed, 100 Serbs or Jews would be shot. The resistance movement in Belgrade was led by Major Žarko Todorović from 1941 until his arrest in 1943.

Belgrade was bombed by the Allies on 16 April 1944, killing about 1,100 people. This bombing fell on the Orthodox Christian Easter. Most of the city remained under German occupation until 20 October 1944, when it was liberated by the Red Army and the Communist Yugoslav Partisans. On 29 November 1945, Marshal Josip Broz Tito proclaimed the Federal People's Republic of Yugoslavia in Belgrade (later to be renamed to Socialist Federal Republic of Yugoslavia on 7 April 1963).
 Higher estimates from the former secret police place the victim count of political persecutions in Belgrade at 10,000.

After World War II 
During the post-war period, Belgrade grew rapidly as the capital of the renewed Yugoslavia, developing as a major industrial center. In 1948, construction of New Belgrade started. In 1958, Belgrade's first television station began broadcasting. In 1961, the conference of Non-Aligned Countries was held in Belgrade under Tito's chairmanship. In 1962, Belgrade Nikola Tesla Airport was built. In 1968, major student protests led to several street clashes between students and the police.
In 1960, architect Svetislav Tisa Milosavljević died there of natural causes.

Breakup of Yugoslavia 

On 9 March 1991, massive demonstrations led by Vuk Drašković were held in the city against Slobodan Milošević. According to various media outlets, there were between 100,000 and 150,000 people on the streets. Two people were killed, 203 injured and 108 arrested during the protests, and later that day tanks were deployed onto the streets to restore order. Further protests were held in Belgrade from November 1996 to February 1997 against the same government after alleged electoral fraud at local elections. These protests brought Zoran Đinđić to power, the first mayor of Belgrade since World War II who did not belong to the League of Communists of Yugoslavia or its later offshoot, the Socialist Party of Serbia.

In 1999, during the Kosovo War, NATO bombings caused substantial damage to the city. Among the sites bombed were the buildings of several ministries, the RTS building, which killed 16 technicians, several hospitals, the Hotel Jugoslavija, the Central Committee building, the Avala Tower, and the Chinese embassy. Several of these buildings have been left in their bombed states to serve as a memorial for the bombings.

After the 2000 presidential elections, Belgrade was the site of major public protests, with over half a million people on the streets. These demonstrations resulted in the ousting of president Milošević.

Contemporary period 
In 2015, an agreement was reached with Eagle Hills (a UAE company) on the Belgrade Waterfront deal, for the construction of a new part of the city on currently undeveloped wasteland by the riverside. This project, officially started in 2015 and is one of the largest urban development projects in Europe, will cost at least 3.5 billion euros.
According to Srdjan Garcevic, "Vaguely contemporary but somehow cheap-looking, it is planted illegally in the middle of the city on unstable soil – serving the interests of the anonymous lucky few."

Names throughout history 

Belgrade has had many names through history, and in nearly all languages the name translates as "the white city" or similar. Serbian name Beograd is a compound of beo ("white, light") and grad ("town, city"), and etymologically corresponds to several other city names spread throughout the Slavdom: Belgorod, Białogard, Biograd etc.

See also 
Timeline of Belgrade history

References

Further reading 
 
 
 
 
 
 
 
 
 

Bura, N., 2004. Illustrated chronology of Belgrade. Prometej.

Journals

External links 

 
Tourism in Belgrade
Tourism in Serbia